Salvaterra de Miño is a town and municipality (concello) in the province of Pontevedra, autonomous community of Galicia, Spain. It's located on the southern border of the province of Pontevedra, at the confluence of the valleys of the rivers Tea and Minho, and by the natural limits of the Serra da Cañiza. It borders the Municipalities of As Neves in the east, Mondariz and Poteareas to the north, and to the south by the Minno river. The Minno river (Río Miño or Rio Minho) is the southern natural border that today separates Portugal with its fortified town of Monção from current Galicia to the north.

Geography

Administrative division 
The municipality (concello) is divided into 17 parishes : Alxén (Saint Pelagious), Arantei (Saint Peter), Cabreira (Sain Michael), Corzáns (Saint Michael), Fiolledo (Saint Pelagious), Fornelos (Saint Jonh), Leirado (Saint Salvador), Lira (Saint Simon), Lourido (Saint Andrew), Meder (Saint Adrian), Oleiros (Saint Mary), Pesqueiras (Saint Marina), Porto (Saint Paul), Salvaterra (Saint Lawrence), Soutolobre (Saint Columba), Uma (Saint Andrew), and Vilacova (Saint Jonh).

References

Municipalities in the Province of Pontevedra